Martin Spang Olsen (born 24 November 1962) is primarily known in Denmark as a lecturer, stuntman, stunt coordinator, writer and actor. But in addition to this, he has supported himself as a philosopher, painter, health and physique expert, composer, futurist, religion historian, concept developer, fight instructor and fight choreographer, musician, singer, songwriter, coach and consultant for the corporate world.

Production
Olsen has written academic books, fiction, philosophical books, children books, poetry, film manuscripts and numerous articles. He has produced CDs, directed documentaries, sung in opera, operetta and musical, composed music for films, performed in art exhibitions and participated in more than 100 TV and film productions as a stuntman, stunt coordinator, director or actor.

Family background and formal education
Olsen is the son of pictorial artist and writer Ib Spang Olsen and painter Nulle Øigaard and older brother of film director Lasse Spang Olsen. He is a Postgraduate from Aurehøj Gymnasium (1981) and holds a MA in Musicology and Classic History from University of Copenhagen and Royal Holloway and Bedford New College (University of London) (UK) (1982–2007).

Music
Besides his Musicology, Olsen has received musical training in classical and jazz guitar, piano, singing, composition and direction. He has sung in several choirs and vocal groups and played in the bands Aurehøj Stompers, The Great Pretenders and RHBNC Jazz-band. Parallel to that he has composed music – such as children's songs, meditation music and film music.

Pictorial arts
Olsen was raised in a creative environment where it was natural to learn the classical art forms. Olsen received private education from his parents and different artists in the family circle, including Hedvig Malmstroem and Erik Lynge. Olsen's debut as an artist was in 1983 and shortly after that, he created Gallery MM in collaboration with attorney Martin von Haller Grønbæk. The gallery was dissolved in 1986. During 2008 Olsen resumed painting again and established in 2010 Eventgalleriet® (The Event Gallery) together with pictorial artist Barbara Kofoed.

Stunt
Olsen is privately trained in stunt in US (1989 and 1990) by Eddie Stacie, Paul Stader, Gene LeBell and Benny Urquedes among others. In 1983 Olsen founded together with his brother Denmark's first stunt school, which today still stands as the world's only stunt school with a consecutive education. The education would last up to ten years and at the same time, the Stunt School initiated the Danish stunt industry. Most Scandinavian stuntmen have received tuition at the Stunt School. Olsen closed down the school in 1997 after 15 years.
As a stuntman and / or actor, Martin Spang Olsen has appeared in more than 100 theater, film and TV productions since 1983.

Fighting styles
Olsen holds several black belts and he has worked extensively with various forms of fight, from historical Western weapons forms to a wide range of oriental fighting styles since 1974. In 2005 he established Nordsjaellands Gong Fu Academi (NGFA) (North Sealand Gong Fu Academy), at which he is currently president and chief instructor. Olsen is trained in 19 different fighting styles in countries such as UK, US and China.

Sensoric Training
In 2012 Martin Spang Olsen founded The Sensoric Training Institute based in Copenhagen, Denmark.

New school forms
In 1996 he founded the system Sang, Dans og Slagsmal (Song, Dance and Fighting) (SDS), an educational system designed to develop children's creative potential and along with this, the concept of The New School. At The New School, children are taught primarily creative, sensuous and physical disciplines for the initial 6 years in order to form the basis of their intellectual development. After this periode, traditional school subjects will be introduced and learned in a much faster pace – due to their initial training (traditional subjects, such as math, language, etc. have been available all along, but scheduled in the afternoon and on a voluntary basis). By request of the Ministry of Education, Olsen created the system Operation Udadvendt Energi (Operation Outgoing Energy) (OUE) in 1999 (in its nature similar to SDS, but more addressed to children with psycho-social problems).  In SDS, training works its way from the students' inner potentials (i.e. from inside out), and OUE works with the students immediate state of mind (from outside and in). SDS is described in the book Sang, Dans og Slagsmal, L & R Fakta, Cph, 1998).

Teaching and consulting
Olsen has been consulting, lecturing and/or teaching at most Danish educational institutions and has acted as a consultant for the corporate world since 1985. In 2006 he developed the concept of Krop & Kontor (Body & Office) in collaboration with Ministry of Health. The system is applying to office jobs and is meant for improve job contentment, zest, and health. Projects are conducted in co-operation with MS Mads Andreasen.

Lectures
Since 1985, Olsen held regular lectures on a wide range of topics, such as pedagogy, creativity, physical movement, health, religion history, etc. Olsen's lectures are typically based on a holistic concept of the world, in which a sophisticated complexity and interaction is paramount.

Organizations
Olsen is the founder of the organizations: Olsen Productions (a merge of Olsen Music, Olsen Graphic, and Olsen Stunt Team), SDS (Sang, Dans og Slagsmål (Song, Dance and Fighting)) (1996)); OUE (Operation Udadvendt Energi (Operation Extrovert Energy)) (1999)); NGFA (Nordsjællands Gong Fu Akademi (Gong Fu Academy of North Sealand)) (2005 ): Reverse The Continents (2008); Kvalitativ Bevægelse (Qualitative Movement) (2008); and he is co-founder of a number of other organizations, including the K-Group (2002), NSFS (Nordic Stage fight Society)  (1995); CFKH (Centre for Creative Energy) (2003), WACIMA (Worldwide Association for Chinese Internal Martial Arts ) (2004), Dionysos® (2007); Krop & Kontor (Body & Office) (2008)

Biography
 Privately educated in croquis, portrait and landscape drawing by Ib Spang Olsen, 1971–86
 Privately educated in watercolour painting by Nulle Øigaard, 1972–1992
 Lessons of painting at Erik Lynge and Hedvig Malmstrøm, 19878-85
 Privately educated (in whole or in part) in classical guitar, piano, singing, composition, directing and choir leading and jazz guitar and musical-song from 1970 to 2010
 Trained in various dance styles from 1991
 Trained (fully or partially) within 19 diff. martial arts (in Denmark, UK, US and China) from 1974 to 2011
 Trained (fully or partially) within a range of extreme sports, including sky diving, scuba diving (PADI Advanced), bungee jump (partially instructor training) and alpine skiing since 1979
 Professional stuntman and actor since 1982 (TV debut in 1967)
 Founder of the Danish stunt industry and Stntskolen (The Stunt School) in Copenhagen 1983
 Debut as a pictorial artist in 1983
 Head of MM Gallery from 1984
 Debut as a singer (classic / musical) 1985
 Consultant and lecturer for business life from 1985
 Trained in stunts work, stunt coordination and fight choreography in the US (Paul Stader, Gene Lebel, and others) 1989–91
 Author of books and articles since 1981
 Trained in historical stage fight (certified instructor) in Norway, Sweden, US and Canada (fight master) from 1995 to 2006
 Cooperation with the Ministry of Education and Ministry of Justice concerning crime prevention and new forms of learning (including his concepts SDS and OUE) in the period 1996 to 2004
 Trained in various massage and healing forms from 1999
 Debut as a poet and songwriter 2000
 Lessons in acting periodically from 2006 to 2009
 MA in Musicology and Classic History 1982 – 2007
 Founder of Nordsjaellands Gong Fu Akademi (North Sealand Gong Fu Academy) (NGFA) 2005
 Cooperation with the Ministry of Health on new approaches to contentment and health in office environments (including Krop & Kontor (Body & Office)) from 2006
 Cooperation with Carlsberg on the development of Artist Town, Bazar of Sustainability, Carlsberg Studios, Eventgalleriet® Event Gallery, etc. from 2010
 Founder of the concept Around the Continents 2011
 Debut as journalist og host in the series TV From Another Planet 2012
 Founder of The Sensoric Training Institute in Copenhagen, Denmark and starts diploma program 2012

Filmography

Actor 
 Himlen Falder  (2009)
 Inkasso (2004)
 Kærlighed ved første hik 3 – Anja efter Viktor (2003)
 I Kina spiser de hunde (1999)
 Blind gudinde (1996–97)
 Davids bog (1996)
 Operation Cobra (1995)
 Jesus vender tilbage (1992)
 Sea Dragon (1990)
 Duksedrengen (1989)
 Mord i mørket (1986)
 Den kroniske uskyld (1985)
 Midt om natten (1984)

Stunts 
 Himlen Falder  (2009)
 Inkasso (2004)
 Den gode strømer (2004)
 Svarte penge, hvite løgner (2004)
 Jolly Roger (2001)
 Davids bog (1996)
 I Kina spiser de hunde (1999)
 Farlig farvann 1995)
 Bekinisesongen (1993)
 Krummerne 2 - Stakkels Krumme (1992)
 Painful City (1992)
 Gøngehøvdingen (1992)
 Drengene fra Sankt Petri (1991)
 Sea Dragon (1990)
 Bananen - skræl den før din nabo (1990)
 Duksedrengen (1989)
 Miraklet i Valby (1989)
 Jydekompangniet 3 (1989)
 Lykken er en underlig fisk (1989)
 Mord i Paradis (1988)
 Een gang strømer... (1987)
 Mord i market (1986)
 Yes, det er far  (1986)
 Walter og Carlo – op på fars hat (1985)
 Den kroniske uskyld (1985)
 Midt om natten (1984)

Bibliography
 Stunt (I-II) (Bogfabrikken Fakta, 1991)
 Stunttræning – vold som leg (Gyldendal, 1994).
 Sang, Dans og Slagsmål (L&R Fakta 1998)
 Organisk Frasering (Edition Wilhelm Hansen, 2002)
 Martin S' Julerim (Elkjaeroghansen, 2002)

External links
 
 Martin Spang Olsen's website
 Institut for Sensorisk Træning / Sansetræner Official webpage for The Sensoric Training Institute
 Sansetræner / Sensoric Trainer Facebook-group primarily in Danish, but open to all
 Sensoric Training Institute International Facebook-page

Danish male actors
1962 births
Living people
People from Copenhagen